The Treaty of Ayllón was a peace treaty that was signed in 1411 in Ayllón, Castile, between the Kingdom of Portugal and the Crown of Castile.

References

Sources

1410s treaties
Ayllon
Treaties of the Crown of Castile
1411 in Portugal
1411 in Europe
15th century in Castile